The 2016 Clásica de San Sebastián was the 36th edition of the Clásica de San Sebastián road bicycle race. The race took place on 30 July 2016. It was won by Dutch rider Bauke Mollema.

Teams
The 18 UCI World Tour teams are automatically entitled and obliged to start the race. The race organization handed out wildcards to two UCI Professional Continental teams, Caja Rural–Seguros RGA and Cofidis, Solutions Crédits.

Results

References

Clásica de San Sebastián
Clásica de San Sebastián
Clásica de San Sebastián
Clásica de San Sebastián